Greater Copenhagen may refer to:

Urban area of Copenhagen
Copenhagen metropolitan area
A marketing name for the municipalities that make up the Øresund Region

See also
Greater Copenhagen and Skåne Committee

Geography of Copenhagen